Madhupur is a town with a municipality in Deoghar district in the Indian state of Jharkhand. It is a subdivisional town, famous for the production of sweets and widely considered a popular health resort for tourists as the water and overall climate is said to cure many stomach and digestion ailments.

History 
Madhupur Junction railway station was used to store coal which was used as a fuel for steam engines.

Historically, there were many notable people, particularly from Bengal, who owned a house in Madhupur and lived there for long periods whenever they could. Amongst them were Sir Asutosh Mookerjee. His younger son, Uma Prasad Mookerjee, the writer famous for his travel books spent time there

Geography

Location
Madhupur is surrounded by two monsoon rivers, Pathro Nadi and Jayanti Nadi. They feed the Ajay, which is a tributary of the Ganges, meeting it at Katwa in West Bengal.

Police Station 
Madhupur Police Station has jurisdiction over Madhupur Municipality area and its nearby villages that comes under the jurisdiction of Madhupur block.

Overview
The map shows a large area, which is a plateau with low hills, except in the eastern portion where the Rajmahal hills intrude into this area and the Ramgarh hills are there.  The south-western portion is just a rolling upland. The entire area is overwhelmingly rural with only small pockets of urbanisation.

Note: The full screen map is interesting. All places marked on the map are linked in the full screen map and one can easily move on to another page of his/her choice. Enlarge the full screen map to see what else is there – one gets railway connections, many more road connections and so on.

Demographics

Population 
According to the 2011 Census of India, Madhupur had a total population of 55,238, of which 28,889 (52%) were males and 26,349 (47%) were females. Population in the age range 0–6 years was 7,848 (14%). The total number of literate persons in Madhupur was 37,658 (79.46% of the population over 6 years) out of which male and female literacy rate is 86.46 and 71.72 percent respectively.

Religion 

Hinduism is the majority religion of Madhupur town followed by 59.87% of the population. Islam is the dominant minority religion in the town followed by 38.93% of the people.

Economy

Industry 
La Opala RG Limited is an India-based company set up a small factory in Madhupur, Jharkhand, to manufacture opal glass in India for the first time. Founded in by Sushil Jhunjhunwala and Ajit Jhunjhunwala. The company is a leading manufacturer and marketer of life style product in the tableware segment. The Company deals with glass and glassware. The company's products include opalware and crystal. Opalware includes dinner sets, cup saucer sets, coffee mug sets, tea sets and soup sets. Crystal includes barware, vases, bowls, ashtrays and beer mugs.

Education

Colleges 

 Madhupur College, Jharkhand

Schools 

 Carmel School Madhupur - CISCE 
 Madhusthali Vidyapeeth - CISCE 
 Mahendra Muni Saraswati Shishu Vidya Mandir - CBSE 
 Mothers International Academy - CBSE 
 Kendriya Vidyalaya - CBSE 
 Shalom School - CBSE 
 Nalanda Academy - CBSE 
 St. Joseph High School - JAC 
 MLG High School - JAC
 Shyama Prasad Mukherjee High School - JAC
 Anchi Devi Balika Uccha Vidyalaya - JAC

Healthcare 

 All India Institute of Medical Sciences, Deoghar
 Subdivisional Hospital, Madhupur

Tourism 

 Maa Pathrol Kali Temple is located in Madhupur, Deoghar in the Santhal Parganas division of the state of Jharkhand, India. It is roughly 7 km from the Madhupur Town. The temple consists of a shrine dedicated to Goddess Kali. It is one of the oldest and sacred temple in Madhupur which was built by Raja Digvijay Singh about 6 to 7 centuries ago. Worship is held every day from Monday to Sunday.  Animals are sacrificed as part of worship. There are nine more temple close to the main temple. An Annual fair is held every year during the month of Kartik (Oct.-Nov.) where thousands and thousands, of Pilgrims and devotees gather here for the worship and to witness the fair.
 Budheshwari Temple is located across the Pathro river on its verge near village Burhai which is just 28 km from Madhupur. The image of Goddess Kali  known as Maa Budheswari is installed up on a hill of one solid block. The sight of the hill is very picturesque. A large number of people assemble there on the eve of Nawan Mela in the month of Agrahan(Nov-Dec) to worship. The Mela is concluded when the day is over. A fair is also held here on the occasion of Makar Sankranti in the month of Magh(Jan-Feb)

Apart from religious significance, It attracts a number of tourists due to its scenic natural beauty, calm & peaceful environment. Bakulia Falls, Usri Falls and Ramkrishna Mission etc. counts amongst most famous attractions of the town. Being an important railway junction on the Delhi-Howrah line it is well-connected to other major parts of the country thus making it easier for people to reach here. Madhupur has gained popularity as Health Resort due to the two Monsoon Rivers, Patro Nadi & Jaynti Nadi flowing here the water of which is believed to provide relief from various stomach and digestion ailments. The weather in Madhupur is very pleasant during the months from October to March, and so it proves to be the best time to visit.

Transport

Airport 

Deoghar Airport (IATA: DGH, ICAO: VEDO), is the closet domestic airport located approximately 31 km (19 mi) from the Madhupur. The airport was inaugurated by Prime Minister Narendra Modi on July 12, 2022. As of now IndiGo operates its flight services only for Delhi and Kolkata. Flights for some other destinations that includes both Ranchi, Patna and Bengaluru are expected to start in upcoming months. The nearest international airport is Netaji Subhash Chandra Bose International Airport in Kolkata which is located 294 km (182 mi) from the town.

Railway 

Madhupur Junction Station Code : MDP is connected by road and rail to metropolitan areas of India.Madhupur station lies in Delhi-Kolkata Main Line (via Mugalsarai-Patna route). Giridih district headquarters is connected to the Indian Railway network through the Madhupur-Giridih Local train on the Madhupur-Giridih-Koderma line. It is well connected by road from Giridih and Deoghar.

See also
 Deoghar district
 Deoghar
 Giridih

References

Cities and towns in Deoghar district